You Can Live Forever is a 2022 Canadian drama film, written and directed by Sarah Watts and Mark Slutsky. Set in the 1990s, the film stars Anwen O'Driscoll as Jaime, a teenager who is sent to live with her aunt Beth (Liane Balaban) after her father's death; Beth is married to Jean-François (Antoine Yared), a devoutly religious Jehovah's Witness who aspires to be a leader of his congregation. Jaime soon develops a romantic relationship with Marike (June Laporte), another young woman in the Jehovah's Witness community.

The film's cast also includes Hasani Freeman, Deragh Campbell, Marc-Antoine Auger, Tim Campbell, Xavier Roberge, Lenni-Kim Lalande and Juliette Gariépy.

The film was inspired in part by Watts' own upbringing in a Jehovah's Witness community, but Watts has indicated that it is not autobiographical. The film entered production in fall 2021, with filming taking place in Montreal and Saguenay.

The film premiered in June 2022 at the Tribeca Film Festival. You Can Live Forever was also screened at the Reelout Queer Film Festival in February 2023.

Cast 

 Anwen O'Driscoll as Jaime
 June Laporte as Marike
 Liane Balaban as Beth
 Antoine Yared as Jean-François (JF)
 Hasani Freeman as Nate
 Deragh Campbell as Amanda
 Lenni Kim as Simon

Reception

Critical response
On the review aggregator website Rotten Tomatoes, the film has an approval rating of 100% based on 10 reviews, with an average rating of 7.5/10.

Awards
The film was shortlisted for Best Direction in a Feature Film at the 2022 Directors Guild of Canada awards.

References

External links

2022 films
2022 romantic drama films
2022 LGBT-related films
Canadian romantic drama films
Canadian LGBT-related films
English-language Canadian films
LGBT-related drama films
2020s English-language films
Lesbian-related films
Films shot in Montreal
Films about LGBT and Christianity
2020s Canadian films